South Korea, as Korea, competed at the 1984 Summer Olympics in Los Angeles, United States. The nation returned to the Summer Games after participating in the American-led boycott of the 1980 Summer Olympics. 175 competitors, 116 men and 59 women, took part in 97 events in 19 sports. As the country hosted the next Olympics in Seoul, a traditional Korean segment was performed at the closing ceremony.

Medalists

Archery

Korea's second appearance in Olympic archery was highly successful, especially for the women's team. Seo Hyang-soon (서향순) set new Olympic records in both the single and double FITA round categories. The Korean medalists were separated by only 13 points, while the fourth place competitor was 31 points behind Kim Jin-ho (김진호).

Women's Individual Competition
 Seo Hyang-soon (서향순) — 2568 points (→  Gold Medal and Olympic Record)
 Kim Jin-ho (김진호) — 2555 points (→  Bronze Medal)
 Park Young-sook (박영숙) — 2445 points (→ 17th place)

Men's Individual Competition
 Koo Ja-chung (구자중) — 2500 points (→ 8th place)
 Choi Won-tae (최원태) — 2490 points (→ 11th place)
 Jeon In-su (전인수) — 2467 points (→ 22nd place)

Athletics

Men's 100 metres
 Sim Deok-seop

Men's 200 metres
 Jang Jae-geun

Men's 800 metres
 Kim Bok-joo

Men's 1,500 metres
 Kim Bok-joo

Men's Marathon
 Lee Hong-yul — 2:20:56 (→ 37th place)
 Hong Nak-chae — 2:23:33 (→ 48th place)
 Kim Won-sick — 2:30:57 (→ 58th place)

Men's 3,000 metres Steeplechase
 Kim Ju-ryong

Men's Triple Jump
 Park Yeong-jun

Men's Long Jump
 Kim Jong-il
 Qualification — 7.86m
 Final — 7.81m (→ 8th place)

Women's 100 metres
 Lee Young-sook
 First Heat — 12.06s (→ did not advance)

Women's 200 metres
 Mo Myeong-hui

Basketball

Women's Team Competition
 Preliminary Round
 Defeated Canada (67-62)
 Defeated Yugoslavia (55-52)
 Lost to United States (47-84)
 Defeated Australia (54-48)
 Defeated PR China (69-56)

 Final
 Lost to United States (55-85) →  Silver Medal

 Team Roster
 Park Chan-sook
 Sung Jung-a
 Lee Hyung-sook
 Lee Mi-ja
 Moon Kyung-ja
 Kim Eun-sook
 Kim Hwa-soon
 Kim Young-hee
 Choi Aei-young
 Choi Kyung-hee
 Jeong Myung-hee

Boxing

Men's Light Flyweight (–48 kg)
 Kim Kwang-sun
 First Round — Lost to Paul Gonzales (United States), on points (0:5)

Men's Flyweight (–51 kg)
 Heo Yeong-mo

Men's Bantamweight (–54 kg)
 Moon Sung-kil
 First Round — Bye
 Second Round — Defeated John Hyland (Great Britain), retired in third round
 Third Round — Defeated Robert Shannon (United States), referee stopped contest in third round
 Quarterfinals — Lost to Pedro Nolasco (Dominican Republic), referee stopped contest in first round

Men's Featherweight (–57 kg)
 Park Hyeong-ok

Men's Lightweight (–60 kg)
 Jeon Chil-seong

Men's Light-Welterweight (–63.5 kg)
 Kim Dong-gil

Men's Welterweight (–67 kg)
 An Yeong-su

Men's Light-Middleweight (–71 kg)
 An Dal-ho

Men's Middleweight (–75 kg)
 Shin Joon-sup →  Gold Medal
 First Round — Defeated Patrick Lihanda (Uganda), on points (5:0)
 Second Round — Defeated Rick Duff (Canada), on points (4:1)
 Quarterfinals — Defeated Jeremiah Okorodudu (Nigeria), on points (4:1)
 Semifinals — Defeated Arístides González (Puerto Rico), on points (4:1)
 Final — Defeated Virgil Hill (United States), on points (3:2)

Canoeing

Cycling

Nine cyclists, six men and three women, represented South Korea in 1984.

Men's individual road race
 Park Se-ryong
 Kim Cheol-seok
 Lee Jin-ok
 Sin Dae-cheol

Team time trial
 Jo Geon-haeng
 Jang Yun-ho
 Kim Cheol-seok
 Lee Jin-ok

Women's individual road race
 Choi Eun-suk → 42nd place
 Mun Suk → 43rd place
 Son Yak-seon → 44th place

Diving

Men's 10m Platform
 Park Jong-ryong

Fencing

Seven fencers, five men and two women, represented South Korea in 1984.

Men's épée
 Kim Seong-mun
 Yun Nam-jin
 Lee Il-hui

Men's team épée
 Kim Bong-man, Kim Seong-mun, Lee Il-hui, Min Gyeong-seung, Yun Nam-jin

Women's foil
 O Seung-sun
 Choi Bok-ran

Gymnastics

Handball

Men's Team Competition
 Preliminary Round (Group B)
 Lost to West Germany (25:37)
 Lost to Denmark (31:28)
 Lost to Sweden (23:36)
 Lost to Spain (25:31)
 Drew with United States (22:22)

 Classification Match
 11th/12th place: Defeated Algeria (25:21) → 11th place

 Team Roster
 An Jin-soo
 Choi Geun-yeon
 Choi Tai-sub
 Hwang Yo-na
 Kang Duck-soo
 Kang Jae-won
 Kang Tae-koo
 Koh Suk-chang
 Lee Kwang-nam
 Lee Sang-hyo
 Lim Kyu-ha
 Lim Young-chul
 Park Byung-hong
 Park Young-dae
 Shim Jung-man

Women's Team Competition
 Team Roster
 Kim Kyung-soon
 Lee Soon-ei
 Jeong Hyoi-soon
 Kim Mi-sook
 Han Hwa-soo
 Kim Ok-hwa
 Kim Choon-rye
 Jeung Soon-bok
 Yoon Byung-soon
 Lee Young-ja
 Sung Kyung-hwa
 Yoon Soo-kyung

Judo

Modern pentathlon

Three male modern pentathletes represented South Korea in 1984.

Individual
 Jeong Gyeong-hun
 Kim Il
 Gang Gyeong-hyo

Team
 Jeong Gyeong-hun
 Kim Il
 Gang Gyeong-hyo

Rowing

Sailing

Shooting

Twenty South Korean shooters (twelve men and six women) qualified to compete in the following events:
Men

Women

Open

Swimming

Men's 100m Butterfly
 Bang Jun-young
 Heat — 58.91 (→ did not advance, 39th place)

Men's 200m Butterfly
 Bang Jun-young
 Heat — 2:07.80 (→ did not advance, 27th place)

Women's 100m Freestyle
 Kim Jin-sook
 Heat — 1:00.91 (→ did not advance, 30th place)

Women's 200m Freestyle
 Kim Jin-sook
 Heat — 2:13.76 (→ did not advance, 29th place)

Women's 100m Backstroke
 Choi Yun-hee
 Heat — 1:07.35 (→ did not advance, 24th place)

Women's 200m Backstroke
 Choi Yun-hee
 Heat — 2:23.80 (→ did not advance, 21st place)

Tennis
Women's individual (demonstration event)
 Susanna Lee

Volleyball

Men's Team Competition
 Preliminary Round (Group A)
 Defeated Tunisia (3-0)
 Lost to United States (0-3)
 Defeated Brazil (3-1)
 Defeated Argentina (3-2)

 Classification Matches
 5th/8th place: Defeated China (3-1)
 5th/6th place: Defeated Argentina (3-1) → 5th place

 Team Roster
 Lee Jong-kyung
 Kang Doo-tae
 Chang Yoon-chang
 Lee Yong-bun
 Lee Bum-joo
 Yang Jin-wung
 Moon Yong-kwan
 Yoo Joong-tak
 Kim Ho-chul
 No Jin-su
 Kang Man-soo
 Chung Euy-tak

Women's Team Competition
 Preliminary Round (Pool A)
 South Korea — Japan 1-3 (15-8, 11-15, 2-15, 7-15)
 South Korea — Canada 3-0 (15-10, 15-1, 15-3)
 South Korea — Peru 2-3 (8-15, 6-15, 15-7, 15-6, 3-15)
 Classification Match
 5th-8th place: South Korea — Brazil 3-1 (13-15, 15-13, 15-9, 15-10)
 5th-6th place: South Korea — West Germany 3-0 (15-10, 15-10, 15-2) → Fifth place

 Team Roster
 Lee Eun-kyung (이은경)
 Lee Un-yim (이은임)
 Jin Chun-mae (진전매)
 Lee Young-sun (이영순)
 Kim Jeong-sun (김정순)
 Jae Sook-ja (제숙자)
 Han Kyung-ae (한경애)
 Lee Myung-hee (이명희)
 Kim Ok-sun (김옥순)
 Park Mi-hee (박미희)
 Lim Hye-sook (임혜숙)
 Yoon Chung-hae (윤정해)

Weightlifting

Wrestling

References

Korea, South
1984
Summer Olympics